Steven Clynch (born 1984) is an Irish hurler who currently plays as a left wing-forward for the Meath senior team.

Clynch joined the panel and 2002 and made his first appearance for the senior team during the 2003 Walsh Cup and immediately became a regular member of the starting fifteen.  Since then he has won three Kehoe Cup medals and a Nicky Rackard Cup in 2009. He has been selected on the christy ring cup allstar team of the year in 2007,2009 2012 and 2013.

At club level Clynch is a Leinster intermediate medalist with Kilmessan. He has also won five county club championship medals.

Clynch has also won an Inter-provincial Championship medal with Leinster. Steven has represented Ireland in the hurling/shinty international tests against Scotland on four occasion winning all four. 2005,2009,2010'2012.

References

 

1984 births
Living people
Ireland international hurlers
Kilmessan hurlers
Meath inter-county hurlers
Leinster inter-provincial hurlers